Atla is a village in Rapla Parish, Rapla County, Estonia. As of 2011 Census, the village's population was 81. Between 1991–2017 (until the administrative reform of Estonian municipalities) the village was located in Juuru Parish.

After the Great Northern War it was owned by the Maydells and the Helffreichs. From 1873 to its dispossession in 1919 the Barlöwens lived there. Nowadays a private pottery is located in the manor.

References

External links
Atla Manor and Pottery 

Villages in Rapla County
Kreis Harrien